Haberdashers' Crayford Academy (formerly Haberdashers' Aske's Crayford Academy) is a mixed secondary school and sixth form with academy status sponsored by the Worshipful Company of Haberdashers. It is located in the Crayford area of the London Borough of Bexley, England.

The school was opened in 2009, and is located on the site of the old Barnes Cray Primary School. It is a girls' and boys' school although in lessons and forms the school separate girls and boys.

Originally an all-through school for pupils aged 3 to 18, in 2013 Slade Green Junior School was absorbed into Crayford Academy with the school then being based over two sites. In 2019 the primary school provision of the school was formally split, forming two new primary schools: Haberdashers' Aske's Crayford Temple Grove (next to the original school) and Haberdashers' Aske's Slade Green Temple Grove on the former Slade Green Junior School site. Haberdashers' Aske's Crayford Academy continues as a secondary school for pupils aged 11 to 18.

In September 2021 the school dropped the 'Aske's' from its title following controversy over the legacy of Robert Aske.

Academics 
The school has a music specialism which grants it the right to admit 10% of its pupil intake on musical aptitude.

References

External links
 

Secondary schools in the London Borough of Bexley
Academies in the London Borough of Bexley
Haberdashers' Schools
Specialist music colleges in England